Cobi was the official mascot of the 1992 Summer Olympics and Petra was the official mascot of the 1992 Summer Paralympics, both held in Barcelona, Spain.

Cobi is a Catalan Sheepdog in Cubist style designed by Javier Mariscal and inspired by the interpretations of Picasso of a masterpiece from Velázquez, Las Meninas. He was unveiled to the public in 1987. His name was derived from the Barcelona Olympic Organising Committee (COOB).

After the popularity reached by Cobi, the COOB'92 requested Mariscal to  create other characters to accompany Cobi on his adventures around the world. They appeared as supporting characters in books, stationery and figurines along other licensed products. For this to happen, he took out of the archives some original ideas that had been archived during the period when he was developing Cobi and in it were rescued the Palmerito which was a Mediterranean palm that had created life and an anthropomorphized lobster with a big smile. However, he realized that his first design proposal would fit much better at the Paralympic Games. Petra was originally one of Cobi's first drafts and had eventually been himself, because he had felt it could be used in another time. When he was redesigning the lines was became clearer, with stronger features and gaining more humanized characteristics. Due the COOB'92 demands the creative lines of Mariscal, had to be would have to be kept in all of them  and also the names had to be in Catalan or Spanish. In this group, there was a character who stood out more than the others, she was a girl who kept the features of Cobi. However, taller and without arms, which at the same time shocked and sensitized at first glance. Her name was Petra and that with a short time of existence captivated COOB'92 employees and was already considered the informal mascot of the Paralympic Games. Unlike Cobi who was short, shy, fearful and uncoordinated. Petra was tall, slender, brave, chatty and friendly. Her personality was like a ray of light and had no bad time and never gave up on anything until the possibilities run out, which made the other characters uncomfortable in the stories. Her personality is based on Mariscal's friend, the plastic artist Lorenza Böttner who had lost her arms in an electrical accident as a child and became famous in Barcelona because of her artistic interventions in which she painted on the ramblas dancing to happy music using her legs, feet, mouth and body. Böttner, who was a transsexual woman, enchanted everyone around her because she did not saw her as a person with a disability and despite being HIV positive she had a totally normal life. Due this characteristic he recreated Petra, an armless girl that is supposed to convey positivity, extrovertism, independence, energy and bravery.
Before and during the Games, Cobi and Petra were shown in a variety of advertisements for Olympic and Paralympic sponsors such as Coca-Cola, Brother Industries and Danone. They even had their own television series, The Cobi Troupe which was sold to over 24 broadcasters worldwide, with the Israeli channel also making a series of live-action shorts called קובי כבל מייקר (Cobi Cable Maker), featuring Cobi competing in various sports. They also appeared on an extensive range of souvenirs, dubbed Cobiana, which proved to be a lucrative source of income. During the Games inflatable versions of Cobi and Petra were tethered to the Barcelona waterfront.

References

"Cobi the pooch: not your average Olympic mascot", Anchorage Daily News, quoted in Robert E Rinehart (1998), Players All: Performances in Contemporary Sport, Indiana University, p137, 
Donald McNeill (1999), Urban Change and the European Left, Routledge (UK), p47-8, 

Olympic mascots
Paralympic mascots
Spanish mascots
Fictional Catalan people
Fictional dogs
Fictional dolls and dummies
Dog mascots
1992 Summer Olympics
1992 Summer Paralympics
Catalan culture
Fictional amputees